Smilin' Guns is a 1929 American silent Western film, directed by Henry MacRae and starring Hoot Gibson.

Plot
Cowboy Jack "Dirty Neck" Purvin travels to San Francisco to learn how to become a refined gentleman to impress Helen van Smythe. Upon his return from San Francisco, Purvin is forced to shed his training to save van Smythe from the grasp of a count, and her mother from a jewel thief.

Cast
 Hoot Gibson as  Jack Purvin
 Blanche Mehaffey as Helen van Smythe
 Virginia Pearson as Mrs. van Smythe
 Robert Graves as Durkin
 Leo White as Count Barett
 Walter Brennan as Ranch Foreman
 Jack Wise as Professor
 James Bradbury Jr. as Barber
 Dad Gibson as Stationmaster (credited as Walter "Dad" Gibson)

Preservation status
 A print exists at the Library of Congress.

References

External links
 
 

1929 films
1920s Western (genre) comedy films
1920s English-language films
Films based on short fiction
Films directed by Henry MacRae
Universal Pictures films
American black-and-white films
1929 comedy films
Silent American Western (genre) comedy films
1920s American films